Pishgam ("pioneer") is an Iranian 300-kilogramme space capsule and associated rocket ( Kavoshgar-Pishgam "Explorer-Pioneer"), which launched containing rhesus monkey and is part of a series of Iranian rocket launches containing biological cargo intended as precursors to human spaceflight.

Kavoshgar programme
The sounding rocket plus return capsule combination are capable of undertaking a twenty-minute flight and reach a height of 120 km. This is a sub-orbital flight  not similar to the Safir rocket which launched Omid, a domestically-built data-processing satellite into low Earth orbit.

The objective is to prepare for manned space flight after 2020, by sending monkeys into space.
The Iranian Space Agency said before the first launch that they had five adolescent rhesus monkeys from South East Asia. The monkey's health is checked before launch and the launch is intended to demonstrate that the life support systems work and that the monkey will land in good health.

Earlier versions
On February 3, 2010, ISA launched a Kavoshgar-3 (Explorer-3) rocket with one rodent, two turtles, and several worms into sub-orbital space and returned them to Earth alive. The rocket was enabled to transfer electronic data and live footage back to Earth. The Aerospace Research Institute (ARI) showed live video transmission of mini-environmental lab to enable further studies on the biological capsule. This was the first biological payload launched by Iran.

On March 15, 2011, the ISA launched the Kavoshgar-4 (Explorer-4) rocket carrying a test capsule designed to carry a monkey but without living creatures on board. It contained the equipment to house the monkey, without an actual monkey.

September 2011 flight
Kavoshgar-5 (Explorer-5), carrying a live monkey, was launched for a 20-minute sub-orbital flight in September 2011, however the mission failed. The capsule contained a rhesus monkey. On October 3, Iran indefinitely postponed further plans while scientists reviewed readiness for future missions.

28 January 2013 flight
In May 2012, Iran announced that it would send more living creatures into space by the summer.

On 1 August 2012 Hamid Fazeli from the Iranian Space Agency announced that the monkey would be launched after Ramadan, which ended on 19 August 2012. There were no subsequent announcements until December 2012 when it was said that the launch would be soon.

On 28 January 2013 Iran announced that the launch has taken place on that day, which has religious significance as the birthday of Mohammed, known as Mawlid. Further details were not given except that the craft landed safely and the monkey survived. Later, on January 31, ISNA published a full video of the Pishgam Launch, from before the launch to reaching apogee and successful return of the monkey while the monkey remains conscious throughout the voyage.

December 14, 2013 flight
On December 14, 2013, Iran launched  Kavoshgar-e Pazhuhesh (Kavoshgar 8) with a second monkey, named Fargam, on a suborbital flight. The monkey is retrieved successfully and safe, after the short 15 minute flight according to the full video of launch published by ISA website.

See also
Monkeys and apes in space
Animals in space
Iranian Crewed Spacecraft

References

Space program of Iran
Solid-fuel rockets